A partial lunar eclipse will take place on July 18, 2046.

Visibility

Related lunar eclipses

Lunar year series

Half-Saros cycle
A lunar eclipse will be preceded and followed by solar eclipses by 9 years and 5.5 days (a half saros). This lunar eclipse is related to two total solar eclipses of Solar Saros 127.

See also
List of lunar eclipses and List of 21st-century lunar eclipses

Notes

External links

2046-07
2046-07
2046-07
2046 in science